Pieter Barbiers IV (1798 – 1848), was a 19th-century painter from the Northern Netherlands.

Biography
He was born in Haarlem as the son of Pieter Bartholomeusz Barbiers (III) and Maria Geertruida Snabilie. He made silhouettes from the living model, but who also made engravings after paintings or drawings by other artists for biographical prints. He married Maria Agnes Meyerink in 1838 in Kampen, who continued his business in prints and silhouettes after his death as Wed. Barbiers te Zwolle. His sister Maria Geertruida Barbiers became a flower painter. He died in Zwolle.

References

Pieter Barbiers the Younger on artnet

1798 births
1848 deaths
19th-century Dutch painters
Dutch male painters
Artists from Haarlem
19th-century Dutch male artists